456th may refer to:

456th Bombardment Group, air combat unit of the United States Army Air Forces during the Second World War
456th Bombardment Squadron, inactive United States Air Force unit
456th Bombardment Wing, inactive United States Air Force unit
456th Fighter-Interceptor Squadron, inactive United States Air Force unit

See also
456 (number)
456 (disambiguation)
456, the year 456 (CDLVI) of the Julian calendar
456 BC